Glynn Purnell (born 4 January 1975 in Solihull, England) is an English chef, restaurateur and television personality. Described by the Birmingham Post as "undoubtably the finest chef to hail from Chelmsley Wood", he is the proprietor and Head Chef at Purnell's restaurant in Birmingham, England, which was awarded a Michelin star in January 2009.

Early life
Purnell was born in Chelmsley Wood, a large council estate in north Solihull. His dad worked in a factory his mum was a dinner lady.

When he was young he would cook for his younger brother and sister, feeding them beans on toast with curry powder and chopped onions. His first experience working in a kitchen was when he did work experience at the Metropole Hotel at Birmingham's National Exhibition Centre at the age of 14, returning for a six-year apprenticeship when he left school.

Career

Chef 
Purnell's career in fine dining started in 1996 when he joined Andreas Antona at Simpsons restaurant – then based in Kenilworth, Warwickshire – as chef de partie. While at Simpsons he worked on placements with other notable chefs including Gordon Ramsay and Gary Rhodes, and at restaurants in Lyon, Montpellier and the Basque Country. In 2002 he worked for six months as sous chef at Claude Bosi's Hibiscus restaurant in Ludlow, Shropshire.

In 2003 Purnell was appointed to his first Head Chef role at Jessica's in Edgbaston, Birmingham, which was awarded the first Michelin star given to a Birmingham restaurant in 2005, and was also named English "Restaurant of the Year" by the AA the same year.

Purnell left Jessica's in 2007 and opened his own restaurant, Purnell's in Cornwall Street, in Birmingham's city centre, which was also awarded a Michelin star in January 2009, and itself won the AA Restaurant of the Year award in September of the same year. The restaurant also won the Square Meal Best Restaurant of the Year Award in 2012.

In August 2010 it was announced that Purnell would be opening a second restaurant – The Asquith, an "ambitious, neighbourhood restaurant" – in the premises of the former Jessica's in Edgbaston.
In April 2011, The Asquith closed its doors due to a dispute with the buildings landlord. In 2015 the building was converted into luxury apartments.

Television 
Purnell is a regular presenter and chef on BBC show Saturday Kitchen. He has also appeared as judge on Come Dine With Me - Champion of Champions, and featured on Secret Kitchen and Great British Menu. In 2017, he helmed 40 episodes of My Kitchen Rules for its third series.

Books 
Purnell has published several cookery books including Rib Ticklers and Choux-ins (2016) and Cracking Yolks & Pig Tales (2017). He has also published a children's book, The Magical Adventures of Whoops the Wonder Dog (2018).

.

External links
 Purnell's Restaurant Official website
 4 page interview with Glynn Purnell

References

1975 births
Living people
English chefs
People from Birmingham, West Midlands
People from Solihull
Head chefs of Michelin starred restaurants